Language and Linguistics Compass is an online peer-reviewed linguistics journal established by Blackwell Publishers (now Wiley-Blackwell) in 2006. One of eight Compass journals, Language and Linguistics Compass publishes state-of-the-art review articles aimed at an international readership. The target audience includes academic researchers, postgraduates students and advanced undergraduates.
The editors-in-chief are Edwin Battistella (from Southern Oregon University) and Natalie Schilling (from Georgetown University).

Aim 

The aim of Language and Linguistics Compass is to be a reference tool for researchers working across the fields of linguistics; its primary focus among these fields, however, is instances of pedagogy in linguistics. The journal cites researching essays, preparing lectures, writing a research proposal, and keeping up with new developments as specific aims.  Articles are intended to be about 5,000 and are available as pdfs organized into annual volumes.

Editorial staff and sections 

The editors-in-chief of Language and Linguistics Compass are Professor Edwin Battistella of Southern Oregon University and Professor Rochelle Lieber of the University of New Hampshire, supported by Managing Editor Liam Cooper.  The journal is organized into nine departments or sections, each managed by a section editor or coeditors assisted by an editorial advisory board.

 Computational & Mathematical
 Education & Pedagogy
 Historical & Comparative
 Phonetics & Phonology
 Pragmatics & Semantics
 Cognitive Science of Language
 Sociolinguistics
 Syntax & Morphology
 Typology

Publication plan and process 
Language and Linguistics Compass aims to publish 100 articles each year.  Articles undergo blind peer review and are published continuously rather than according to a specific release date.  Articles are produced to look like traditional print journal articles and remain in the archived online indefinitely. Selected articles include Teaching and Learning Guides for use by university professors.

References

External links 
 http://www.blackwell-compass.com/subject/linguistics/

Linguistics journals
Wiley (publisher) academic journals
2006 establishments in the United Kingdom
Publications established in 2006